Williamsport is a town in Washington Township, Warren County, in the U.S. state of Indiana. The population was 1,898 at the 2010 census.  It is the county seat of Warren County and is the largest of the four incorporated towns in the county.  Williamsport Falls is located in downtown Williamsport.

History
Williamsport was platted by (and named for) William Harrison on December 11, 1828, on the south end of the eastern fractional part of the northeast quarter of section 11, township 21, range 8.  Harrison was the first to occupy the town in the fall of 1828; he built a log house at the east end of Main Street near the river and operated a ferry crossing there for several years.  Though located on the opposite side of the river from the Wabash and Erie Canal, Williamsport sought to draw shipping traffic by constructing a short cut-off canal.  Finished around 1852, the project led to the nickname "Side-Cut City".

Williamsport became the county seat in June 1829, taking the title away from short-lived Warrenton.  Its post office was the first in the county and has operated since September 28, 1829.  The town was incorporated in March 1854, at which time its population was 552.

The post office at Williamsport has been in operation since 1829.

James Frank Hanly, who was the Governor of Indiana from 1905 to 1909, lived and practiced law here from 1879 to 1896; he is buried at Hillside Cemetery, on the northeast side of town.

The Williamsport-Washington Township Public Library opened in 1917 as a Carnegie library, and moved to a new facility in 2002.

Historic places
The Williamsport Presbyterian Church at 15 Fall Street, built in 1889, appears on the Indiana Register of Historic Sites and Structures.  It was closed in 1964 and stood vacant until 1991, when a non-profit corporation was set up to support the restoration effort.  It was listed in 1998 after having received a new slate roof and other repairs.  The building contains the original stained glass windows, bell, pulpit, and pews.

The "Tower House" can be found at 303 Lincoln Street and was constructed in 1854.  The house was nicknamed due to its three-story tower on the northeast corner of the building.  The house was originally constructed as a mirrored twin; the twin house was destroyed by a fire in the 1990s.  The house has changed from its original construction.  An enclosed front porch and side porch has been retooled to serve as the current family's kitchen area.  The house originally contained two large rooms upstairs, and three rooms downstairs.  What appears to be the summer kitchen and original carriage house still stand.  The house now has five bedrooms, one bath upstairs and seven rooms, an enclosed porch, and a bath downstairs.  They were listed on the National Register of Historic Places in 1984 as the Kent and Hitchens Houses.

The Warren County Courthouse at 125 North Monroe Street was built in 1907-1908 and is on the United States National Register of Historic Places.  It is the fourth purpose-built court house in the county's history.

Geography

Williamsport is located along State Road 28 near the shores of the Wabash River which forms the eastern border of the county.  Its most striking natural feature is Williamsport Falls, a 90-foot waterfall near the center of town and Indiana's tallest.  Williamsport's original section ("Old Town") is in bottom land next to the river; "New Town" was built on the hill above it to be closer to the railroad.  The rail line through town is currently operated by Norfolk Southern Railway.

Demographics

As of the 2010 United States Census, there were 1,898 people, 766 households, and 513 families residing here. The racial makeup was 98.3% white, 0.5% Asian, 0.3% black or African American, 0.2% Pacific islander, 0.1% American Indian, 0.3% from other races, and 0.4% from two or more races. Those of Hispanic or Latino origin made up 1.0% of the population. In terms of ancestry, 22.0% were German, 10.4% were American, 9.2% were Irish, and 5.7% were English.

Of the 766 households, 31.5% had children under the age of 18 living with them, 49.5% were married couples living together, 12.3% had a female householder with no husband present, 33.0% were non-families, and 29.6% of all households were made up of individuals. The average household size was 2.37 and the average family size was 2.90. The median age was 42.5 years.

The median income for a household was $37,969 and the median income for a family was $48,026. Males had a median income of $41,719 versus $28,875 for females. The per capita income was $17,487. About 16.3% of families and 19.2% of the population were below the poverty line, including 29.0% of those under age 18 and 9.2% of those age 65 or over.

Education
The town is served by the Williamsport-Washington Township Public Library, one of two public libraries in Warren County.

Economy
Industry in Williamsport includes TMF Center, which manufactures parts for construction equipment and trucking; GL Technologies, which procures industrial tooling; and Kuri-Tec, which manufactures industrial hoses and accessories.

The town includes the county's single hospital, St. Vincent Williamsport Hospital, a 16-bed acute care facility operated by Indianapolis-based St. Vincent Health.  The hospital includes a 24-hour emergency medical service and ambulance service.  Williamsport also has a nursing home, "Williamsport Nursing and Rehabilitation", that provides health care and rehabilitation services primarily for seniors.  These are important local employers, as 9.8% of Warren County's jobs relate to health care and social services.

Notable people
 Emily Caroline Chandler Hodgin (1838-1907), temperance reformer
 Ele Stansbury (born 1861), 23rd Indiana Attorney General

References

Bibliography
 
 
 
 

Towns in Warren County, Indiana
Towns in Indiana
County seats in Indiana
Populated places established in 1828
1828 establishments in Indiana